Haruehun Noppawan (born September 6, 1986), better known by Haruehun Airry, is a Thai photographer living in Bangkok, Thailand.

Biography 
Haruehun graduated with a Bachelor of Arts in Communication Management from Chulalongkorn University where he was friends with Charm Osathanond, Miss Thailand Universe 2006, and began photographing her. As a role model for young men in Thailand, he was appointed by the Thai Red Cross AIDS Research Centre an advocate for a charity project called Adam's Love which fosters comprehensive HIV/AIDS education in 2011.

Career 

His photography, mainly of men, has been published widely on Asian social media since he was a student, and later in the publications Attitude and Men's Health. A number of amateur male models in various countries have been introduced to the entertainment industry through his photography. Haruehun Airry stirred public opinion when his nude photography series featuring a former Mister International titleholder was published.

Attitude magazine, in its first Thai language issue, noted that Haruehun Airry is one of the youngest successful photographers.

See also
 Jiho Lee

References

External links
 Photo by Haruehun Airry on Facebook
 Haruehun Airry on Blogspot

Haruehun Airry
Living people
1986 births
Haruehun Airry